This is a list of German-language names for places in France.

Complete list 

Lists of German exonyms
German exonyms
Names of places in France